Elaeodendron australe, commonly known as red olive-berry, red-fruited olive plum, or blush boxwood, is a species of flowering plant in the family Celastraceae and is endemic to eastern Australia. It is a shrub or small tree with egg-shaped to oblong leaves with a wavy margin, yellowish green male and female flowers on separate plants and fleshy orange-red fruit.

Description
Elaeodendron australe is dioecious; that is, male and female flowers are borne on separate plants. Male flowers have four stamens and female flowers have four staminodes. The fruit is ripe from March to July and often persists on the tree for many months.

Taxonomy
Elaeodendron australe was first formally described in 1805 by Étienne Pierre Ventenat in his book Jardin de la Malmaison.

In 1825, de Candolle described two varieties in Prodromus Systematis Naturalis Regni Vegetabilis and the names are accepted by the Australian Plant Census:
 Elaeodendron australe var. integrifolium  (Tratt.) DC.

Distribution and habitat
Red olive-berry grows in eucalypt and rainforest ecotone areas, and in littoral or dry rainforest. It is found in north-eastern and central eastern Queensland and as far south as Tuross Head in New South Wales. An unusual thick-leaved form occurs in Mount Kaputar National Park and nearby western slopes and dry tableland gorges.

Use in horticulture
Seed germination is very slow, but reliable with around a 25% success rate after twelve months.

References

australe
Sapindales of Australia
Flora of Queensland
Flora of New South Wales
Plants described in 1805
Taxa named by Étienne Pierre Ventenat
Dioecious plants